Raza Talish is a Pakistani actor and director. 

He is the son of director Aehsun Talish and grandson of senior actor Agha Talish. Raza is known for his role as Shahryar in Tabeer (2018) and as Mithu in Suno Chanda 2 (2019). 

He also worked as an assistant director for the 2022 drama film Tich Button featuring Farhan Saeed and Iman Ali.

Personal life
Born in Lahore but residing in Karachi, Raza Talish is the son of Pakistani director Aehsun Talish, and a grandson of award-winning Pakistani actor Agha Talish. 

An  alumnus of the Lyceum School, Lahore, he later joined the National College of Arts (NCA) for higher education, and after completing his studies he joined his father's company and started directing plays.

Career 
He started his acting in 2018 Pakistan television drama serial Tabeer. In 2019, he appeared as Subugtageen (Mithu) in Hum TV's Suno Chanda 2 which earned him critical acclaim and recognition.

Filmography

Television

Film

References 

Living people
Year of birth missing (living people)
Pakistani film directors
Pakistani television producers
Pakistani male television actors
National College of Arts alumni